The Cabinet of Australia (or Federal Cabinet) is the chief decision-making organ of the executive branch of the government of Australia. It is a council of senior government ministers, ultimately responsible to the Federal Parliament.

Ministers are appointed by the governor-general, on the advice of the prime minister, who is the leader of the Cabinet. Cabinet meetings are strictly private and occur once a week where vital issues are discussed and policy formulated. The Cabinet is also composed of a number of Cabinet committees focused on governance and specific policy issues. Outside the Cabinet there is an outer ministry and also a number of assistant ministers (designated as parliamentary secretaries under the Ministers of State Act 1952), responsible for a specific policy area and reporting directly to a senior Cabinet minister of their portfolio. The Cabinet, the outer ministry, and the assistant ministers collectively form the full Commonwealth ministry of the government of the day.

As with the prime minister of Australia, the Constitution of Australia does not recognise the Cabinet as a legal entity; these roles actually exist solely by convention. Decisions of Cabinet do not in and of themselves have legal force. Instead, it convenes to function as a practical "foreshadowing" of the business of the Federal Executive Council, which is, officially (per the Constitution), Australia's highest formal governmental body established by Chapter II of the Constitution of Australia. In practice, the Federal Executive Council meets solely to endorse and give legal force to decisions already made by the Cabinet.

All members of the Cabinet are members of the Executive Council; whereas the nominal presiding officer, the governor-general, almost never attends Executive Council meetings. A senior member of the Cabinet holds the office of vice-president of the Executive Council and acts as presiding officer of the Executive Council in place of the governor-general.

History 
Until 1956 Cabinet comprised all ministers. The growth of the ministry in the 1940s and 1950s made this increasingly impractical, and in 1956 Liberal Prime Minister Robert Menzies created a two-tier ministry, with only senior ministers being members of Cabinet, while the other ministers are in the outer ministry. This practice has been continued by all governments since, with the exception of the Whitlam government.

When the non-Labor parties have been in power, the prime minister has advised the governor-general on all Cabinet and ministerial appointments at his own discretion, although in practice he consults with senior colleagues in making appointments. When the Liberal Party and its predecessors (the Nationalist Party and the United Australia Party) have been in coalition with the National Party (or its predecessor the Country Party), the leader of the junior Coalition party has had the right to nominate his party's members of the Coalition ministry, and to be consulted by the prime minister on the allocation of their portfolios.

When the Labor Party first held office under Chris Watson, Watson assumed the right to choose members of the Cabinet. In 1907, however, the party decided that future Labor Cabinets would be elected by members of the Parliamentary Labor Party, the caucus, and this practice was followed until 2007. The prime minister retained the right to allocate portfolios. In practice, Labor prime ministers exercised a predominant influence over who was elected to Labor Cabinets, although leaders of party factions also exercised considerable influence.

Under two-tier ministerial arrangements introduced in 1987, each senior or "portfolio" minister was a member of the Cabinet. In 1996 this was modified by the Howard government, whereby two portfolio ministers, one being the attorney-general, were not members of Cabinet, and one portfolio had two Cabinet ministers. In subsequent Howard ministries, and the 2007 Rudd Labor ministry, all portfolio ministers were in the Cabinet.

Before the 2007 election, Kevin Rudd announced that if Labor won the election he would dispense with this tradition and appoint the ministry himself. In fact, the caucus rule requiring the election of ministers remains in place. At the first caucus meeting after the election, Rudd announced the members of his chosen ministry, and the caucus then elected them unopposed, thus preserving the outward form of caucus election.

Function 
In a parliamentary context, the Cabinet is of little procedural consequence; its relationship to Parliament being similar to the relationship between the ministry as a whole and Parliament. It is fundamentally an administrative mechanism to assist with the decision-making process of the executive government.

Composition 
Members of both the House of Representatives and Senate are eligible to serve as ministers and parliamentary secretaries. A minister does not have to be a member of either house, but Section 64 of the Constitution of Australia requires the minister to become a member within three months. The prime minister and treasurer are traditionally members of the House of Representatives, but the Constitution does not have such a requirement. As amended in 1987, the Minister of State Act 1952 permits up to 30 ministers. As members of one house cannot speak in the other, ministers in each house serve as representatives of colleagues in the other for answering questions and other procedures.

 every government since federation has had senators serve as ministers. The Senate typically provides one-quarter to one-third of the ministry. Some former senators and others have proposed that senators should not be eligible to serve as ministers, stating that doing so is inappropriate for members of a chamber that act as the states' house and a house of review and because governments are only responsible to the House of Representatives. John Uhr and Senator Baden Teague state that an advantage of senators serving in ministries is that the Senate can compel them to answer questions about the government.

Since the introduction of the two-tier ministry, meetings of Cabinet are attended by members only, although other ministers may attend if an area of their portfolio is on the agenda. Cabinet meetings are chaired by the prime minister, and a senior public servant is present to write the minutes and record decisions.

Since 1942, every member of the Cabinet has been a member of the Australian Labor Party, the Liberal Party of Australia, or the National Party of Australia.

Cabinet collective responsibility 

The Australian Cabinet follows the traditions of the British parliamentary cabinet system, in following the principle of cabinet collective responsibility. While the Cabinet is responsible to parliament for making policy decisions, Cabinet discussions are confidential and are not disclosed to the public apart from the announcement of decisions. This secrecy is necessary to ensure that items of national security are not made public, and so that ministers can speak freely and disagree with each other during discussions.

Ministers are bound by a principle of cabinet solidarity, meaning that once cabinet has made a decision, all ministers must publicly support and defend that decision, regardless of their personal views on the subject.

Cabinet documents are held separately from other documents and may be destroyed once no longer in use, or when a change of government occurs. Since 1986, minutes and records of Cabinet meetings are embargoed from public release or disclosure for 30 years. Despite this, several filing cabinets containing classified documents were obtained by the Australian Broadcasting Corporation after they were sold at a government surplus auction. The documents, aspects of which were published in January 2018, reveal the inner workings of recent governments, and have been characterized by the ABC as the largest breach of cabinet security in the nation's history.

Cabinet committees 
As with other Westminster system cabinets, Cabinet committees play an important role in the effectiveness of the Cabinet system and providing avenues for collective decision-making on particular policy issues. Under the Morrison government, the following Cabinet committees existed:

The National Security Committee (NSC) focuses on major international security issues of strategic importance to Australia, border protection policy, national responses to developing situations (either domestic or international) and classified matters relating to aspects of operation and activities of the Australian Intelligence Community. Decisions of the NSC do not require the endorsement of the Cabinet. The NSC is chaired by the prime minister with the deputy prime minister as deputy chair and includes the attorney-general, the minister for foreign affairs, the minister for defence, the treasurer, the minister for immigration and border protection, and the Cabinet secretary.

The Expenditure Review Committee (ERC) considers matters of regarding expenditure and revenue of the Australian federal budget and the Mid-Year Economic and Fiscal Outlook. Decisions of the ERC must be endorsed by the Cabinet. The ERC is chaired by the prime minister with the treasurer as deputy chair and includes the deputy prime minister, the minister for social services, the minister for health, the minister for finance, and the minister for revenue and financial services.

The Digital Transformation Committee (DTC) considers matters of digital transformation across government. Decisions of the DTC must be endorsed by the Cabinet. The DTC is chaired by the prime minister with the minister for communications and the arts as deputy chair and includes the minister for industry, innovation and science; the minister for finance; the minister for immigration and border protection; the minister for health; the Cabinet secretary; the minister for revenue and financial services; the minister for human services; and the assistant minister for cities and digital transformation.

The National Infrastructure Committee (NIC) provides advice on the government's infrastructure agenda to support the nation's productivity including major public works projects, co-operation with the states and territories and the private sector on infrastructure investment and delivery, and infrastructure policy. Decisions of the NIC must be endorsed by the Cabinet. The NIC is chaired by the prime minister with the deputy prime minister as deputy chair and includes the minister for regional development/minister for regional communications/minister for local government and territories, the treasurer, the Cabinet secretary, the minister for finance, the minister for infrastructure and transport, the minister for urban infrastructure, and the assistant minister for cities and digital transformation.

The Indigenous Policy Committee (IPC) coordinates a whole-of-government approach to Indigenous policy decision-making and program implementation. Decisions of the IPC must be endorsed by the Cabinet. The IPC is chaired by the prime minister with the minister for indigenous affairs as deputy chair and includes the attorney-general, the minister for women and minister for employment, the minister for infrastructure and transport, the minister for social services, the minister for health, the minister for education and training, the Cabinet secretary, and the assistant minister for health and aged care.

The Innovation and Science Committee (ISC) provides advice on science, research and innovation matters, including the implementation of the National Innovation and Science Agenda, development of innovation and science policy, and the National Innovation and Science Plan. Decisions of the ISC must be endorsed by the Cabinet. The ISC is chaired by the prime minister with the minister for industry, innovation and science as deputy chair and includes the deputy prime minister, the minister for foreign affairs, the treasurer, the minister for defence industry, the minister for health, the Cabinet secretary, the minister for education and training, the minister for the environment and energy, and the assistant minister for industry, innovation and science.

The Parliamentary Business Committee (PBC) considers priorities for the Australian government's legislation program and requests to the prime minister for the presentation of ministerial statements. Decisions of the PBC do not require the endorsement of the Cabinet. The PBC is chaired by the leader of the house with the leader of the government in the Senate as deputy chair and includes manager of government business in the senate, the deputy leader of the house, and the assistant minister to the prime minister.

The Service Delivery and Coordination Committee (SDCC) considers the implementation of the government's key priorities, including joined up service delivery and communications. The SDCC is chaired by the minister for immigration and border protection and includes the minister for regional development/minister for regional communications/minister for local government and territories (deputy leader of the National Party), the assistant minister to the prime minister, the special minister of state and minister assisting the Cabinet secretary, and the assistant minister for industry, innovation and science.

The Governance Committee (GC) provides advice and oversight of governance and integrity issues, which include the Statement of Ministerial Standards and issues arising from the Lobbyist Code. The GC is chaired by the prime minister with the deputy prime minister (leader of the Labor Party) as deputy chair and includes the minister for foreign affairs (deputy leader of the Liberal Party), the attorney-general (leader of the government in the Senate), and the Cabinet secretary.

Current Cabinet

Shadow cabinet 

Led by the leader of the Opposition, the Opposition in parliament appoints from its ranks a shadow cabinet to monitor government ministers and present itself as an alternative government. The portfolios of shadow ministers usually correspond with those of the government. When the Liberal and National parties are in Opposition, the shadow cabinet is appointed by the leader of the Opposition in consultation with the leader of the Nationals. When Labor has been in Opposition, the caucus has elected the shadow ministry and the leader has allocated portfolios. Smaller opposition parties often appoint spokespersons for Cabinet portfolios, but these are not referred to as a shadow cabinet.

See also 
 Current Australian Commonwealth ministry
 List of female cabinet ministers of Australia
 Shadow Cabinet of Australia

References 

Government of Australia
Australia, Cabinet
Lists of government ministers of Australia